The Netherlands national wheelchair handball team is the national wheelchair handball team of Netherlands and is controlled by the Netherlands Handball Association. The Netherlands won the only two editions of the European Wheelchair Handball Nations’ Tournament.

Competitive record

European Wheelchair Handball Nations’ Tournament

Wheelchair Handball World Championship

Current squad 
The Dutch international squad at the 2018 European Wheelchair Handball Nations’ Tournament

Head coach:Piet Neeft

References

External links 
 website
EHF Team Page

National wheelchair handball teams
Handball in the Netherlands
National sports teams of the Netherlands